Dario Biasi (born 24 August 1979) is an Italian football defender currently playing for Pavia in Lega Pro.

Biography
On 18 January 2007 he was re-signed by Verona.

On 14 July 2010 Biasi was signed by Cagliari in a 2-year contract.

In December 2010 he was signed by Frosinone.

References

External links 
  Profile at legaseriea.it

1979 births
Living people
Italian footballers
A.C. Cesena players
Genoa C.F.C. players
F.C. Pavia players
Hellas Verona F.C. players
Frosinone Calcio players
Association football defenders